Tribhuvandas Foundation is a public Charitable trust working with the  AMUL milk cooperatives in and around Kheda district of Gujarat. Its mission is to work for betterment of health in rural communities of Central Gujarat.

History 
The Tribhuvandas Foundation was set up by Tribhuvandas Kishibhai Patel- the founding Chairman of the Kheda District Milk Producers Cooperative Union, today better known as AMUL. TF as it is commonly known was registered as a public charitable trust in 1975, under the Bombay Public Trust act, 1950.

Tribhuvandas Foundation started activities in 1980, with grants from National Dairy Development Board, AMUL and UNICEF. It later received  grants from the Overseas Development Administration, the predecessor to DFID.  The initial project plan conceived TF as an  Integrated rural development program. It is now  a  Community health organisation, working mainly on reproductive and child health.

Work 
TF covers around 682 villages, working through the village milk cooperatives of AMUL, in  18 talukas in the districts of Anand and Kheda in Gujarat state of India. The population covered would be around 1,600,000 (around sixteen lakhs or one million six hundred thousand). Since 2001 it has launched a rural health insurance scheme, covering around one hundred thousand households.

During the financial year, April 1, 2008 to 31 March 2009, the outreach was as under - 
 The villagelevel health workers of TF treated 639,672 patients for  32 common diseases and conditions.
700 TB patients were under the care of trained certified Village Health Worker (VHW) DOT providers
Mother Healthcare Program
Urine Pregnancy Tests done – 11,895
New pregnancies registered – 39,934 - 55% registered in first trimester
No. of visits to regd. pregnant women – 89,403
Referrals for High-risk pregnancies - 3,992
Total deliveries registered – 36,294 – 80% deliveries in hospital
Lactating mothers provided counseling – 27,094
Family planning services provided in field – 23,094

Child Healthcare Program 

 At birth Male:Female ratio noted in this area – 54:46
 Low Birth Weight less than 2.5 kg babies noted – 11%
 Colostrum Feeding in 3 hours of birth – 74%
 Newborn put on KMC - 524
 Bath to newborn after 7 days – 15%
 Neo natal Mortality Rate (NMR) – 25
 Gr III–IV undernourished children < 1 yr – 4%
 Participation of TF in Mamta Divas (MCH-vaccination sessions in RCH) – 10,001 events Average ANC/session - 7, Children/session - 13

Cancer Awareness Program 

 Households visited for survey – 1,59,511
 Persons contacted – 7,32,365
 Population found addicted – 40%
 Persons motivated for de-addiction – 3,379
 “High risk for cancer” persons referred to hospital – 4,622
 Confirmed new cancer patients - 468
 Cancer patients followed in field – 2,938
 Patients completed treatment - 77
 Cancer Awareness Meetings held – 16,176
 Cancer diagnosis camps held 5 - 738 patients attended

Health Camps organized in 65 villages 

 Viewers of health exhibition in 65 villages– 8,804
Anti-rabies vaccine doses provided – 2,998
Anti-Hepatitis B Vaccine doses – 67,334
Family Planning operations – 670, IUDs – 3
1,664 employees of 422 village milk cooperative societies of AMUL provided health check up services.
416 Annual General Body Meetings of village milk cooperatives attended

Disposable Delivery Kit (DDK)Unit
DDKs manufactured – 23,892
DDKs distributed – 22,160
From March 2009, TF has tied up   with Sankara Eyecare Institute's Anand Hospital for eyecare in 7 blocks - to eradicate preventable blindness . From March 9 to mid-Sept 09, the Sankara-TF joint efforts have reached around  1100 people - who have been provided COMPLETELY FREE eye surgeries, mostly for senile cataract. Training inputs have been provided to all village health workers of TF.

TF has also been enlisted to provide training to members of Village Health and Sanitation Committees of Village Gram Panchayats of all the villages of Umreth, Anklav and Anand talukas of Anand District and Balasinor and Virpur talukas of Kheda District during the financial year 08-09. The Gujarat state government has provided grants for this project of around Rs.1100,000 (eleven lakhs or one million one hundred thousand rupees).

Apart from community health, TF also has programs for children, (Balwadi program) and for livelihood enhancement of women (handicrafts). TF also has organised anti tobacco campaigns in its program villages.

The Chairperson of the National Dairy Development Board, Dr.(Ms) Amrita Patel assessed the organisation thus  in an international workshop " Tribhuvandas Foundation, which is Asia’s largest NGO, works in over 600 villages in the State in the field of maternal and infant care. What is unique about the programme of the Foundation is that it rides on the back of milk. It is the village milk co-operative that appoints a village health worker and pays an honorarium to the village health worker to undertake the work. So it is milk paying for health."

Academic resources

The national medical journal of India, Volume 16, No.2, 2003 pages 79–89.
''The National Dairy Board: prepaid health services through an agriculture cooperative in India.
Author: Halse M. Source: In: National Council for International Health [NCIH], Cooperative League of the US, Group Health Association of America. Alternative health delivery systems: can they serve the public interest in Third World settings? Occasional papers. Washington, D.C. NCIH, 1984 Aug. :7-11. Document number 026323.*

References

External links
Amul.com
Wikimapia
http://tribhuvandasfndn.wix.com/tfanand

Health charities in India
Organisations based in Gujarat
Healthcare in Gujarat
Organizations established in 1975
1975 establishments in Gujarat